Umami ( from  ), or savoriness, is one of the five basic tastes. It has been described as savory and is characteristic of broths and cooked meats.

People taste umami through taste receptors that typically respond to glutamates and  nucleotides, which are widely present in meat broths and fermented products. Glutamates are commonly added to some foods in the form of monosodium glutamate (MSG), and nucleotides are commonly added in the form of disodium guanylate,  inosine monophosphate (IMP) or guanosine monophosphate (GMP). Since umami has its own receptors rather than arising out of a combination of the traditionally recognized taste receptors, scientists now consider umami to be a distinct taste.

Foods that have a strong umami flavor include meats, shellfish, fish (including fish sauce and preserved fish such as maldive fish, Katsuobushi, sardines, and anchovies), tomatoes, mushrooms, hydrolyzed vegetable protein, meat extract, yeast extract, cheeses, and soy sauce.

Etymology
A loanword from Japanese , umami can be translated as "pleasant savory taste". This neologism was coined in 1908 by Japanese chemist Kikunae Ikeda from a nominalization of umai "delicious". The compound  (with mi "taste") is used for a more general sense of a food as delicious. There is no current English equivalent of umami; however, some close descriptions are "meaty", "savory", and "broth-like".

Background
Scientists have debated whether umami was a basic taste since Kikunae Ikeda first proposed its existence in 1908.  In 1985, the term umami was recognized as the scientific term to describe the taste of glutamates and nucleotides at the first Umami International Symposium in Hawaii. Umami represents the taste of the amino acid L-glutamate and 5'-ribonucleotides such as guanosine monophosphate (GMP) and inosine monophosphate (IMP). It can be described as a pleasant "brothy" or "meaty" taste with a long-lasting, mouthwatering and coating sensation over the tongue.

The sensation of umami is due to the detection of the carboxylate anion of glutamate in specialized receptor cells present on the human and other animal tongues. Some 52 peptides may be responsible for detecting umami taste. Its effect is to balance taste and round out the overall flavor of a dish. Umami enhances the palatability of a wide variety of foods. Glutamate in acid form (glutamic acid) imparts little umami taste, whereas the salts of glutamic acid, known as glutamates, give the characteristic umami taste due to their ionized state. GMP and IMP amplify the taste intensity of glutamate.
Adding salt to the free acids also enhances the umami taste.

Monosodium L-aspartate has an umami taste about four times less intense than MSG whereas ibotenic acid and tricholomic acid (likely as their salts or with salt) are claimed to be many times more intense.

Discovery

Glutamate has a long history in cooking. Fermented fish sauces (garum), which are rich in glutamate, were used widely in ancient Rome, fermented barley sauces (murri) rich in glutamate were used in medieval Byzantine and Arab cuisine, and fermented fish sauces and soy sauces have histories going back to the third century in China. To be sure, in the late 1800s, chef Auguste Escoffier, who opened restaurants in Paris and London, created meals that combined umami with salty, sour, sweet, and bitter tastes. However, he did not know the chemical source of this unique quality.

Umami was first scientifically identified in 1908 by Kikunae Ikeda, a professor of the Tokyo Imperial University. He found that glutamate was responsible for the palatability of the broth from kombu seaweed. He noticed that the taste of kombu dashi was distinct from sweet, sour, bitter, and salty and named it umami.

Professor Shintaro Kodama, a disciple of Ikeda, discovered in 1913 that dried bonito flakes (a type of tuna) contained another umami substance. This was the ribonucleotide IMP. In 1957, Akira Kuninaka realized that the ribonucleotide GMP present in shiitake mushrooms also conferred the umami taste. One of Kuninaka's most important discoveries was the synergistic effect between ribonucleotides and glutamate. When foods rich in glutamate are combined with ingredients that have ribonucleotides, the resulting taste intensity is higher than would be expected from merely adding the intensity of the individual ingredients.

This synergy of umami may help explain various classical food pairings: the Japanese make dashi with kombu seaweed and dried bonito flakes; the Chinese add Chinese leek and Chinese cabbage to chicken soup, as do Scots in the similar Scottish dish of cock-a-leekie soup; and Italians grate the Parmigiano-Reggiano cheese on a variety of different dishes.

Properties
Umami has a mild but lasting aftertaste associated with salivation and a sensation of furriness on the tongue, stimulating the throat, the roof and the back of the mouth. By itself, umami is not palatable, but it makes a great variety of foods pleasant, especially in the presence of a matching aroma. Like other basic tastes, umami is pleasant only within a relatively narrow concentration range.

The optimum umami taste depends also on the amount of salt, and at the same time, low-salt foods can maintain a satisfactory taste with the appropriate amount of umami. One study showed that ratings of pleasantness, taste intensity, and ideal saltiness of low-salt soups were greater when the soup contained umami, whereas low-salt soups without umami were less pleasant. Another study demonstrated that using fish sauce as a source of umami could reduce the need for salt by 10–25% to flavor such foods as chicken broth, tomato sauce, or coconut curry while maintaining overall taste intensity.

Some population groups, such as the elderly, may benefit from umami taste because their taste and smell sensitivity may be impaired by age and medication. The loss of taste and smell can contribute to poor nutrition, increasing their risk of disease. Some evidence exists to show umami not only stimulates appetite, but also may contribute to satiety.

Foods rich in umami components 

Many foods are rich in the amino acids and nucleotides imparting umami. Naturally occurring glutamate can be found in meats and vegetables. Inosine (IMP) comes primarily from meats and guanosine (GMP) from vegetables. Mushrooms, especially dried shiitake, are rich sources of umami flavor from guanylate. Smoked or fermented fish are high in inosinate, and shellfish in adenylate.

Generally, umami taste is common to foods that contain high levels of L-glutamate, IMP and GMP, most notably in fish, shellfish, cured meats, meat extracts, mushrooms, vegetables (e.g., ripe tomatoes, Chinese cabbage, spinach, celery, etc.), green tea, hydrolyzed vegetable protein, and fermented and aged products involving bacterial or yeast cultures, such as cheeses, shrimp pastes, fish sauce, soy sauce, nutritional yeast, and yeast extracts such as Vegemite and Marmite.

Studies have shown that the amino acids in breast milk are often the first encounter humans have with umami. Glutamic acid makes up half of the free amino acids in breast milk.

Taste receptors

Most taste buds on the tongue and other regions of the mouth can detect umami taste, irrespective of their location. (The tongue map in which different tastes are distributed in different regions of the tongue is a common misconception.) Biochemical studies have identified the taste receptors responsible for the sense of umami as modified forms of mGluR4, mGluR1, and taste receptor type 1 (TAS1R1 + TAS1R3), all of which have been found in all regions of the tongue bearing taste buds. These receptors are also found in some regions of the duodenum. A 2009 review corroborated the acceptance of these receptors, stating, "Recent molecular biological studies have now identified strong candidates for umami receptors, including the heterodimer TAS1R1/TAS1R3, and truncated type 1 and 4 metabotropic glutamate receptors missing most of the N-terminal extracellular domain (taste-mGluR4 and truncated-mGluR1) and brain-mGluR4."

Receptors mGluR1 and mGluR4 are specific to glutamate whereas TAS1R1 + TAS1R3 are responsible for the synergism already described by Akira Kuninaka in 1957. However, the specific role of each type of receptor in taste bud cells remains unclear. They are G protein-coupled receptors (GPCRs) with similar signaling molecules that include G proteins beta-gamma, PLCB2 and PI3-mediated release of calcium (Ca2+) from intracellular stores. Calcium activates a so-called transient-receptor-potential cation channel TRPM5 that leads to membrane depolarization and the consequent release of ATP and secretion of neurotransmitters including serotonin.

Cells responding to umami taste stimuli do not possess typical synapses, but ATP conveys taste signals to gustatory nerves and in turn to the brain that interprets and identifies the taste quality via the gut-brain axis.

Consumers and safety 
Umami has become popular as a flavor with food manufacturers trying to improve the taste of low sodium offerings. Chefs create "umami bombs", which are dishes made of several umami ingredients like fish sauce. Umami may account for the long-term formulation and popularity of ketchup. The United States Food and Drug Administration has designated the umami enhancer monosodium glutamate (MSG) as a safe ingredient. While some people identify themselves as sensitive to MSG, a study commissioned by the FDA was only able to identify transient, mild symptoms in a few of the subjects, and only when the MSG was consumed in unrealistically large quantities. There is also no apparent difference in sensitivity to umami when comparing Japanese and Americans.

Background of other taste categories 
The five basic tastes (saltiness, sweetness, bitterness, sourness, and savoriness) are detected by specialized taste receptors on the tongue and palate epithelium. The number of taste categories in humans remains under research, with a sixth taste possibly including spicy or pungent.

See also

References

Further reading

External links 
 Umami Information Center, Tokyo, 2016

Gustation
Japanese words and phrases
Culinary terminology
 
1908 introductions
1908 establishments in Japan
1900s neologisms
1985 neologisms